Brand New Knife is a 1997 album by the Japanese rock trio Shonen Knife. The Japanese version of this album contains six tracks with English lyrics and seven versions of the tracks with Japanese lyrics. The U.S. version features all 13 tracks in English, with the Japanese versions of the seven tracks featured as bonus tracks. In 2020, Jonathan McNamara of The Japan Times listed it as one of the 10 Japanese albums worthy of inclusion on Rolling Stones 2020 list of the 500 greatest albums of all time.

Track listing
All songs written by Naoko Yamano, except where noted.
 "Explosion!" - 4:10
 "Wind Your Spring" - 3:27
 "Perfect World" (Michie Nakatani) - 3:51
 "E.S.P" - 3:30
 "Loop Di Loop" (Shonen Knife) - 3:12
 "Wonder Wine" - 3:11
 "Magic Joe" - 3:58
 "Fruits & Vegetables" (Nakatani) - 2:29
 "Tower of the Sun" - 4:25
 "Keep on Rockin'" - 4:30
 "Frogphobia" (Nakatani) - 2:58
 "Buddha's Face" - 4:51
 "One Week" - 2:04US version bonus tracks'
"Explosion!" [Japanese] - 4:10
 "Wind Your Spring" [Japanese] - 3:26
 "E.S.P." [Japanese] - 3:29
 "Wonder Wine" [Japanese] - 3:10
 "Fruits and Vegetables" [Japanese] (Nakatani) - 2:30
 "Tower of the Sun" [Japanese] - 4:24
 "Frogphobia" [Japanese] (Nakatani) - 2:59

Personnel
Naoko Yamano - guitar, vocals
Michie Nakatani - bass, keyboards, vocals
Atsuko Yamano - drums, backing vocals

References

Shonen Knife albums
1997 albums
Japanese-language albums